Kumbungu District is one of the sixteen districts in Northern Region, Ghana. The district assembly is located in the northwest part of Northern Region and has Kumbungu as its capital town.

Originally it was formerly part of the then-larger Tolon-Kumbungu District in 1988, which was created from the former West Dagomba District Council, until the eastern part of the district was split off to create Kumbungu District on 28 June 2012; thus the remaining part has been renamed to become Tolon District.

Populated places 

 Kumbungu
 Dallung
 Gbulung
 Zangbalun

References

Districts of the Northern Region (Ghana)